Enosis is Greek for "union". The term may refer to:

 Enosis – the political movement for the incorporation of territory into the Greek state
 Enosis (butterfly) – a genus of grass skipper butterflies

Sport
 Enosis Agion Omologiton – a Cypriot football club
 Enosis Aspropirgos – a Greek football club
 Enosis Kokkinotrimithia – a Cypriot football club
 Enosis Neon Ayia Napa – a Cypriot football club
 Enosis Neon Paralimni B.C. – a Cypriot basketball club
 Enosis Neon Paralimni FC – a Cypriot football club
 Enosis Neon Parekklisia FC – a Cypriot football club
 Enosis Neon THOI Lakatamia – a Cypriot football club
 Enosis Neon Trust – a Cypriot football club
 Enosis Panelliniou-Antaeus Limassol – a Cypriot football club

Political groups
 Demokratiki Enosis (Democratic Union) – a Greek political party
 Enosis Agrotikon Kommaton (Union of Agrarian Parties) – a Greek electoral list
 Enosis Vasilikon (Union of Royalists) – a Greek political party
 Ethniki Dimokratiki Enosis (National Democratic Union) – a Greek political party
 Ethniki Politiki Enosis (National Political Union (1946)) – a Greek political party
 Ethniki Politiki Enosis (National Political Union (1984)) – a Greek political party
 Ethniki Rizospastiki Enosis (National Radical Union) – a Greek political party

See also
 Ensis – a genus of clams
 Henosis – a mystical process of unity with the One
 List of football clubs in Greece
 List of political parties in Greece